Ekaterina Alekseyevna Dolgorukova (1712–1747) was a Russian noble, engaged to Tsar Peter II of Russia.

Biography 
She was the daughter of the Russian Prince Alexei Dolgorukov and niece to Prince Vasily Lukich Dolgorukov. 
She grew up with her brother Ivan in Warsaw in the house of her grandfather Gregory Fjodorovitj. Reportedly, she and the Austrian ambassador Melissimo were in love with each other. On 19 November 1729, she was officially engaged to the Tsar, given the title "Her Highness the Bride Empress", and installed the day after in the Golovinskii Palace. Melissimo was exiled. 

The wedding never took place because of Peter's death in 1730. Her family, the Dolgorukovs, tried to install her as ruling Empress in the manner of Catherine I of Russia but did not succeed. She left the palace, and at the installment of Empress Anna Ivanovna, she was deported with her family to Beryozov. 

In 1740, she was placed in the convent of Tomsk. In 1741, she was freed by Empress Elizabeth of Russia and appointed lady-in-waiting. In 1745, she married Lieutenant General Count Alexander Romanovich Bruce, son of Robert Bruce (1668–1720). She died of a cold in 1747.

References
 Долгорукова, Екатерина Алексеевна // Томск от А до Я: Краткая энциклопедия города. / Под ред. д-ра ист. наук Н. М. Дмитриенко. — 1-е изд. — Томск: Изд-во НТЛ, 2004. — С. 102. — 440 с. — 3 000 экз. — .

1712 births
1747 deaths

Ladies-in-waiting from the Russian Empire
Ekaterina Alekseyevna
Russian princesses